Bernd Wunderlich is a German former competitive figure skater who represented East Germany. He won the 1973 Friendship Cup in Bucharest and the 1975 East German national title. A competitor at three European Championships and three World Championships, he achieved his best result, seventh, at the 1975 Europeans in Copenhagen, Denmark. He was coached by Inge Wischnewski and represented SC Dynamo Berlin.

Competitive highlights

References 

German male single skaters
Living people
Figure skaters from Berlin
Year of birth missing (living people)